Aiga is a Latvian language feminine given name, the most popular such name descended from Livonian language origins.  Several names have descended from Aiga, among them being Aigis, Aigija, Aigins, Aigisa, and Aigita.  The first recorded use of this name was in 1940 in Riga.  The use of the name peaked in the 1970s and has declined since then.

Among the notable people who share this name are:
 Aiga Grabuste (b. 1988), Latvian athlete
 Aiga Rasch (1941–2009), German illustrator, graphic artist and painter
 Aiga Zagorska (b. 1970), retired Latvian athlete

General references

Latvian feminine given names
Uralic personal names